Cleidogonidae is a family of millipedes in the order Chordeumatida. Adult millipedes in this family have 28, 29, or 30 segments (counting the collum as the first segment and the telson as the last). This family includes the genus Tianella, notable for featuring adult millipedes with 29 segments, a number not found in the adults of any other chordeumatidan species. All Tianella species have adults with 29 segments except for two (T. daamsae and T. mananga) in which adults have only 28 segments. In the Tianella species with 29 segments, adult females have 48 pairs of legs, as one would expect in adult female chordeumatidans with one segment fewer than the 30 usually found in this order. There are seven genera and at least 140 described species in Cleidogonidae.

Genera
 Cabraca Shear, 1982
 Cleidogona Cook, 1895
 Dybasia Loomis, 1964
 Pseudotremia Cope, 1869
 Solaenogona Hoffman, 1950
 Tianella Attems, 1904
 Tiganogona Chamberlin, 1928

References

Further reading

 
 
 
 

Chordeumatida
Millipede families